An ushanka (from , "ears"), also called an ushanka-hat, is a Russian fur cap with ear-covering flaps that can be tied up to the crown of the cap, or fastened at the chin to protect the ears, jaw, and lower chin from the cold. An alternative is to bend the flaps back and tie them behind the head, which is called "ski-style" — this offers less protection from the elements, but much better visibility, essential for high-speed skiing. The dense fur also offers some protection against blunt impacts to the head. They are also traditionally worn in the Baltic region including Sweden and Finland and the whole eastern European region.

Basic materials 
Ushankas are often made from inexpensive sheepskin (tsigeyka), rabbit or muskrat fur. Artificial fur hats are also manufactured and are referred to as "fish fur" since the material is not from any real animal. The simplest "fish fur" of ushankas was made of wool pile with cloth substrate and cloth top, with the exception of the flaps, which had the pile exposed.

History 
Hats with fur earflaps have been known for centuries, especially in the Balkan countries Serbia, Romania, Croatia, Bosnia and Herzegovina, North Macedonia, Bulgaria, as well as in Northeastern Italy, in the Julian March, Trieste, and surrounding areas where there has been a large Slavic population for centuries. Such hats are also seen in Nordic countries Sweden, Norway and Finland, in the Eurasian and European Slavic countries Russia, Ukraine, Slovenia, Poland, Moldova and in Caucasus region in Georgia and Armenia. The design of ushanka with a perfectly round crown was developed in the 17th century when in central and northern Russia a hat with earflaps called treukh was worn. The modern ushanka design from 1917 is also inspired by the Norwegian norvezhka, a hat which was invented by Norwegian arctic explorers. The main difference from the treukh is that the earflaps of the norvezhka were much longer. In addition, Cossacks of the Kuban have influenced the design of modern Ushanka through interaction with peoples from Central Asia and Caucasus.

In 1917 during the Russian Civil War, the ruler of Siberia, Aleksandr Kolchak, introduced a winter uniform hat, commonly referred to as a kolchakovka, c. 1918. It was similar to the ushanka. In 1933, W. C. Fields wore a kolchakovka in the short film The Fatal Glass of Beer. However, Kolchak and the White Army lost the war, and their headgear was not adopted in the new Soviet Union.

Red Army soldiers instead wore the budenovka, which was made of felt. It was designed to resemble historical bogatyr helmets, and did not provide much protection from the cold.

During the Winter War against Finland, organizational failures and inadequate equipment left many Soviet troops vulnerable to cold, and many died of exposure. The Finnish army had much better equipment including an ushanka-style fur hat, the turkislakki M36, introduced in 1936. In 1939, shortly before the Winter War, the slightly improved turkislakki M39 was introduced, and is still in use today. After the Winter War, the Red Army received completely redesigned winter uniforms. Budenovkas were finally replaced with ushankas based on the Finnish example. Officers were issued fur ushankas; other ranks received ushankas made with plush or "fish fur". When they experienced the harsh Russian winter, for example during the Battle of Moscow, German soldiers started to wear ushankas and other Soviet-type winter gear, as their uniforms did not provide adequate protection. WW2 ushanka presented in the Army museum (Russia) and Saumur tank museum (France).

The ushanka became a symbol and media icon of the Soviet Union and later the Russian Federation. Photographs of U.S. President Gerald Ford wearing the cap during a 1974 visit to the Soviet Union were seen as a possible sign of détente.

Current use 

Identified with Soviet rule and issued in all Warsaw Pact armies, the ushanka has since become a part of the winter uniform for military and police forces in Canada and other Western countries with a cold winter. Gray (American civilian police), green (for camouflage), blue (police, United States Post Office) and black versions are in current usage. In 2013, the Russian army announced that the ushanka was being replaced by new headgear, which is essentially the same ushanka with a rounder crown and small sealable openings in the flaps for wearing headphones. It is also still used by the Polish armed forces. 

The ushanka was used by the East German authorities before German reunification, and remained part of the German police uniform in winter afterwards. In the Finnish Defence Forces, a gray hat is used with M62 uniform and a green one of different design is a part of M91 and M05 winter dress. Armoured troops have a black hat (M92), while generals may wear a white M39 hat. The Royal Canadian Mounted Police use a "regulation hat" (between an ushanka and an aviator hat), made of muskrat fur. This replaced the former Astrakhan (hat). Similar ones are used by Toronto Transit Commission staff during winter.

A similar type of headgear is worn in China's People's Liberation Army's winter uniform. Featured in an iconic propaganda image of Lei Feng, this type of hat is often called by Chinese "the Lei Feng hat" (雷锋帽, Lei Feng mao).

It is claimed that British wartime airmen visiting the Kola Inlet to help to protect the Arctic convoys quickly started to wear ushankas because their own uniform hats were not warm enough, but "kept the ear flaps tied up to the crown as any Russian would, because it was considered unmanly to wear them down." However, in the Russian military up to this day, the way of wearing the ushanka — up flaps, down flaps or ski-style — is considered a part of uniform of the day and is usually decided by a unit commander at reveille, so the Russian soldiers aren't actually free about the way they wear their hats. 

A variant of the ushanka is popular in Norway, especially in the north. It is infamous for its name, "bjørnefitte" (bear's vagina), which is considered vulgar in most parts of the country.

Similar hats 
Trapper hats are "a sort of hybrid between the aviator cap and the ushanka—they combine the style of the former with the furriness of the latter". They are considered more casual than the military-derived ushanka.

The Royal Canadian Mounted Police use muskrat ushankas.

Gallery

See also 
 Afghanka
 Aviator hat
 Canadian military fur wedge cap
 Chullo, an Andean hat of similar design
 Deerstalker, a double-brimmed cap with earflaps
 
 Papakha, a Caucasian fur hat without ear flaps
 Stormy Kromer cap
 Telogreika
 Valenki

References

17th-century fashion
18th-century fashion
19th-century fashion
1910s fashion
20th-century fashion
21st-century fashion
Caps
Serbian clothing
Military hats
Headgear
Royal Canadian Mounted Police
Russian clothing
Ukrainian clothing
Fashion of Georgia (country)
Armenian clothing
Winter clothes
Soviet military uniforms